Apatophysis modica is a species of beetle in the family Cerambycidae, in the genus Apatophysis and subgenus Angustephysis. It is found it Afghanistan, Iran, and Pakistan.

References

Dorcasominae
Taxa named by Charles Joseph Gahan